For One Night is a 2006 American made-for-TV drama film directed by Ernest Dickerson, written by Denetria Harris-Lawrence, and starring Raven-Symoné as Brianna McCallister and Aisha Tyler as Desiree Howard. The film's premise is based on the true story of Gerica McCrary, who made headlines in 2002 by getting Taylor County High School in her hometown of Butler, Georgia, to integrate the prom after thirty-one years of segregation.

Plot
Inspired by the true story of an African American teenager who shook up a small town where high school proms had been racially segregated for decades. Amid the protests of the community and with the help of a newspaper reporter who returns to her hometown to cover the story, the two women are able to reverse decades of racist tradition and make history, at least for one night.

Production
For One Night is based on events that occurred in Taylor County, Georgia in 2002. It was filmed in the summer of 2005 in Jefferson, Louisiana shortly before Hurricane Katrina. This film is the first drama role in the career of Raven-Symoné and disengaged from the Disney Channel. In an interview with the film director, Raven-Symoné said that she had to gain weight for the lead role, along with getting a Southern accent.

Cast
Raven-Symoné as Brianna McCallister
Aisha Tyler as Desiree Howard
Jason Lewis as Mark Manning
Sam Jones III as Brandon Williams
Gary Grubbs as Mr. Thornton
William Ragsdale as Earl Randall
Harold Sylvester as Mr Howard, Desiree's dad
Donna DuPlantier as Aunt Marlene
Joan Pringle
Rhoda Griffis as Ginny Stephens
Daina Gozan as Sela Moody
Mills Allison as Ely Hardy
Caroline Jahna as Carla Thornton
James Aaron as Myron Dawson
Louis Herthum as Sheriff Taylor
Katie Seeley as Kelly Reynolds
Azure Dawn as Lily Dubois
Adam Powell as Paul Beaudine
Chuck Halley as Newspaper Editor

Soundtrack
The end of the movie (prom scene) features Raven-Symoné's song "Gravity".

Awards
2007 - Nominated; Image Award for Outstanding Actress in a Television Movie, Mini-Series or Dramatic Special (Aisha Tyler)

Releases
The film was released on iTunes. On July 31, 2012 the film was released in a package of 4 Lifetime movies on DVD titled 'Surviving High School'. In September 2012 it got its own DVD release through A&E Entertainment.

See also
 Segregated prom

References

External links
 
 
Gerica McCrary On How She Integrated Butler High School's Prom
Shandra Hill Smith: The Reporter Who Helped Gerica
Butler, Ga Profile
CNN Article on Gerica
Taylor County's 1st Integrated Prom EVER

2006 television films
2006 films
Films shot in New Orleans
Films about race and ethnicity
Drama films based on actual events
Films directed by Ernest Dickerson
2000s high school films
American high school films
Lifetime (TV network) films
2006 drama films
American drama television films
2000s English-language films
2000s American films